Skillet Creek is a stream in Sauk County, Wisconsin, in the United States.

Skillet Creek was named from rock formations which resembled a cast-iron skillet.

See also
Fryingpan River
List of rivers of Wisconsin

References

Rivers of Sauk County, Wisconsin
Rivers of Wisconsin